Afame, also Afami, is a census-designated place in central Guam. It is located in the village of Sinajana, just south of Hagåtña.

References 

Census-designated places in Guam